MutS protein homolog 5 is a protein that in humans is encoded by the MSH5 gene.

Function 

This gene encodes a member of the mutS family of proteins that are involved in DNA mismatch repair or meiotic recombination processes. This protein is similar to a Saccharomyces cerevisiae protein that participates in meiotic segregation fidelity and crossing-over. This protein forms heterooligomers with another member of this family, mutS homolog 4. Alternative splicing results in four transcript variants encoding three different isoforms.

Mutations 

Mice homozygous for a null Msh5 mutation (Msh5-/-) are viable but sterile.  In these mice, the prophase I stage of meiosis is defective due to the disruption of chromosome pairing.  This meiotic failure leads, in male mice, to diminution of testicular size, and in female mice, to a complete loss of ovarian structures.

A genetic investigation was performed to test women with premature ovarian failure for mutations in each of four meiotic genes.  Among 41 women with premature ovarian failure two were found to be heterozygous for a mutation in the MSH5 gene; among 34 fertile women (controls) no mutations were found in the four tested genes.

These findings in mouse and human indicate that the MSH5 protein plays an important role in meiotic recombination.

In the worm Caenorhabditis elegans, the MSH5 protein is required during meiosis both for normal spontaneous and for gamma-irradiation induced crossover recombination and chiasma formation.  Meiotic recombination is often initiated by double strand breaks. MSH5 mutants retain the competence to repair DNA double-strand breaks that are present during meiosis, but they accomplish this repair in a way that does not lead to crossovers between homologous chromosomes.  The known mechanism of non-crossover recombinational repair is called synthesis dependent strand annealing (see homologous recombination).  MSH5 thus appears to be employed in directing the recombinational repair of some double-strand breaks towards the cross over option rather than the non-cross over option.

Interactions 

MSH5 has been shown to interact with MSH4.

References

Further reading